Mishmarot is a kibbutz in northern Israel near the town of Pardes Hanna-Karkur. Located about 50 m above sea level and close to the villages Ein Shemer and Kfar Glickson, it falls under the jurisdiction of Menashe Regional Council.

History
The village was founded in October 1933, during Sukkot, by immigrants from Soviet Union, Lithuania and Latvia, on Jewish National Fund land, under the auspices of Keren HaYesod. Its name comes from the farm in the Crimea in which the founders trained, called Mishmar (lit. guard shifts). Notable former residents include the musicians Shalom Hanoch and Meir Ariel.

Before the founding of the State of Israel, Mishmarot was home to secret Fosh and Military Industries bases.

References

Latvian-Jewish culture in Israel
Lithuanian-Jewish culture in Israel
Kibbutzim
Kibbutz Movement
Populated places established in 1933
Populated places in Haifa District
Soviet Jews
1933 establishments in Mandatory Palestine
Russian-Jewish culture in Israel